fRoots (pronounced "eff-Roots", originally Folk Roots) was a specialist music magazine published in the UK between 1979 and 2019. It specialised in folk and world music, and featured regular compilation downloadable albums, with occasional specials. In 2006, the circulation of the magazine was 12,000 worldwide. (the year is matched from the "fRoots Advertising Information" that provides the same "readership of 40,000" data for their "2006 readership survey" as the main "around 12,000 worldwide (giving a readership of around 40,000)" claim).

The magazine was also involved in live music production, as well as the BBC Radio 3 Awards for World Music and the Europe in Union concert series.

Overview
In 1979, Southern Rag was founded by folk musician Ian A. Anderson with Caroline Hurrell and Lawrence Heath. 
It was renamed as Folk Roots in 1985, and in 1998 it became fRoots. 
The headquarters was initially in Farnham, Surrey and later moved to Bristol. 
Anderson remained the editor for the magazine's entire forty-year lifespan.

Since 1985, the magazine was published on a monthly basis, with compilation albums twice-yearly. 
After a 2017 Kickstarter campaign, it was re-launched in April 2018 as a larger quarterly magazine, including a compilation album with every issue.

On 2 July 2019, the editor announced that the magazine was suspending publication due to lack of funding, and that the Summer 2019 issue (issue 425) would be its last.

Albums of the year
The fRoots Critics Poll Album of the Year was determined by a panel of "hundreds of experts" in the UK and internationally:

 1986 Graceland by Paul Simon
 1987 Soro by Salif Keita
 1988 Amnesia by Richard Thompson
 1989 Djam Leelii by Baaba Maal and Mansour Seck
 1990 The Complete Recordings by Robert Johnson
 1991 Barking Mad by Four Men and a Dog
 1992 Lam Toro by Baaba Maal
 1993 A Meeting by the River by Ry Cooder and V.M. Bhatt
 1994 Waterson:Carthy by Waterson–Carthy
 1995 Kate Rusby and Kathryn Roberts by Kate Rusby and Kathryn Roberts
 1996 Norma Waterson by Norma Waterson
 1997 Buena Vista Social Club by Buena Vista Social Club
 1998 Red Rice by Eliza Carthy
 1999 Kulanjan by Taj Mahal and Toumani Diabaté
 2000 Wanita by Rokia Traoré
 2001 Missing You  / Mee Yeewnii by Baaba Maal
 2002 Specialist in All Styles by Orchestra Baobab
 2003 Bowmboi by Rokia Traoré
 2004 Egypt by Youssou N'Dour
 2005 Dimanche à Bamako by Amadou & Mariam
 2006 Savane by  Ali Farka Touré
 2007 Segu Blue by Bassekou Kouyate & Ngoni Ba 
 2008 Low Culture by Jim Moray
 2009 Très Très Fort by Staff Benda Bilili
 2010 Hedonism by Bellowhead
 2011 Ragged Kingdom by June Tabor & Oysterband
 2012 Ground of Its Own by Sam Lee
 2013 Clychau Dybon by Catrin Finch & Seckou Keita
 2014 The Moral of the Elephant by Martin Carthy & Eliza Carthy
 2015 From Here by Stick in the Wheel
 2016 Lodestar by Shirley Collins
 2017 Ladilikan by Trio Da Kali & Kronos Quartet
 2018 SOAR by Catrin Finch & Seckou Keita

Between 2002 and 2008 the award was incorporated into the BBC Radio 3 Awards for World Music.

References

Sources

External links
 Official website
 Rogers, Jude (8 July 2019). "'A big tree has fallen': the sad demise of fRoots, bible of British folk", The Guardian.

1979 establishments in England
2019 disestablishments in England
British music awards
Folk music magazines
Magazines established in 1979
Mass media in Surrey
Monthly magazines published in the United Kingdom
Music magazines published in the United Kingdom
World music awards